Chalmers is a town in Big Creek Township, White County in the U.S. state of Indiana. Its population was 508 at the 2010 census.

History

Chalmers dates back to the early 1850s. Land was donated by Gardner Mudge to the Chicago, Indianapolis and Louisville Railway in 1854 after the company constructed a rail line through Big Creek in 1853. Mudge and his brother-in-law operated a general store. On April 21, 1854, a Post Office was established with Mudge serving as postmaster.

Chalmers was platted on July 24, 1873; it included 103 lots on six streets. Several homes and stores were erected, and a school was constructed in the early 1870s. The first church was organized in 1878, and a tile factory was erected in the same year. The Bank of Chalmers was established by Jacob Raub in the early 1890s with a capital of $10,000. Chalmers became an incorporated town in 1892. "The Ledger" served as the first community newspaper, published initially in 1893. In 1895, a train station which later became a symbol of the town's history was constructed.
The village was originally known by many as "Mudge's Station," after Gardner Mudge. The name "Chalmers" was listed on railroad timetables of New Albany and Salem as early as 1856. By 1912, Chalmers had approximately 600 residents. It consisted of two grain elevators, a factory, fifteen stores, two banks, two livery barns, three blacksmith shops, a lumber yard, two hotels, two garages, and dozens of homes.
Although the depot was demolished in 1976, the railroad which passes through Chalmers is still in use and is operated by CSX Transportation.
An archive of the town's history is maintained by the Chalmers Historical Society.

Geography

Demographics

2010 census
As of the census of 2010, there were 508 people, 203 households, and 137 families residing in the town. The racial makeup of the town was 97.0% White, 0.2% Asian, 1.8% from other races, and 1.0% from two or more races. Hispanic or Latino of any race were 2.2% of the population.

There were 203 households, of which 33.5% had children under the age of 18 living with them, 53.7% were married couples living together, 10.3% had a female householder with no husband present, 3.4% had a male householder with no wife present, and 32.5% were non-families. 28.6% of all households were made up of individuals, and 13.8% had someone living alone who was 65 years of age or older. The average household size was 2.50 and the average family size was 3.07.

The median age in the town was 40.1 years. 25% of residents were under the age of 18; 7.6% were between the ages of 18 and 24; 26.2% were from 25 to 44; 27.9% were from 45 to 64; and 13.2% were 65 years of age or older. The gender makeup of the town was 49.0% male and 51.0% female.

2000 census
As of the census of 2000, there were 513 people, 185 households, and 133 families residing in the town. The racial makeup of the town was 99.61% White, and 0.39% from two or more races. Hispanic or Latino of any race were 1.17% of the population.

There were 185 households, out of which 40.0% had children under the age of 18 living with them, 60.5% were married couples living together, 8.6% had a female householder with no husband present, and 28.1% were non-families. 23.2% of all households were made up of individuals, and 13.0% had someone living alone who was 65 years of age or older. The average household size was 2.77 and the average family size was 3.32.

In the town, the population was spread out, with 31.6% under the age of 18, 7.2% from 18 to 24, 32.4% from 25 to 44, 18.9% from 45 to 64, and 9.9% who were 65 years of age or older. The median age was 33 years. For every 100 females, there were 91.4 males. For every 100 females age 18 and over, there were 90.8 males.

The median income for a household in the town was $51,591, and the median income for a family was $55,833. Males had a median income of $31,667 versus $21,518 for females. The per capita income for the town was $19,258. About 5.4% of families and 3.6% of the population were below the poverty line, including 4.9% of those under age 18 and 7.7% of those age 65 or over.

Government
Chalmers has a community-operated government and is managed by a small town council.

Town Hall
The Chalmers Town Hall is in a building that is also a firehouse for the Chalmers Volunteer Fire Department. It is on Walnut Street, next to the community basketball court and the Chalmers Community Church. It is used for council and board meetings, and it's the office of the town's clerk-treasurer.

Town Council
Regular council meetings are held at the Chalmers Town Hall. Meetings are held the 2nd and 4th Tuesday of each month at 6:30 pm. Current officials include the following:
 Renee Collier (President)
 Marcus King (Vice President)
 Patrick Pool
 Pam Brown
 Kristofer Kelley

Public Safety
 Town Marshal - Jared Baer

Public involvement
Chalmers Town Council meetings are open to the public on a monthly basis. They occur on the second and fourth Tuesday of each month at 6:30 PM Eastern Time in the Chalmers Town Hall. Residents are welcome to join and observe these meetings. In addition, each meeting is initiated with a comment session for residents to ask questions or state concerns for the council to address.

Commercial revitalization
As of September 2013, the Chalmers town council is working cooperatively with a committee of residents who have a mission to promote commerce in Chalmers, particularly in its downtown square. The committee is working to better qualify Chalmers for the Indiana Main Street (IMS) program, an economic revitalization assistance organization. The program may assist communities like Chalmers by aiding them with downtown enhancement grants.

Education

Preschool
The Discovering H.A.N.D.S. Preschool is a nonprofit ministry of the local Chalmers Community Church. It operates out of the church facility. H.A.N.D.S. stands for "Hearts and Attitudes are Nurtured while Discovering the Savior."

Primary and secondary
Frontier School Corporation, a public school system, is headquartered in Downtown Chalmers. Most Chalmers students are enrolled in this district. Its single secondary school, Frontier Jr./Sr. High School, was formed to replace the former Chalmers High School as well as the schools in Brookston. Elementary-level children attend the primary school of the same corporation in Brookston, Frontier Elementary School. For the 2012-2013 school year, Frontier was honored as a grade "A" school corporation by the Indiana Department of Education.

Arts and culture
Chalmers is a small community known to have cheerful hospitality.

Chalmers Community Day
For years, an annual festival known as Chalmers Community Day has occurred each summer. It includes a pancake breakfast and a pork dinner, hosted by the volunteer fire department. A car show often takes place at the Downtown square and a motorcycle show at Chalmers Community Park. Many residents conduct garage sales and yard sales at their homes during this event, giving it the nickname "Garage Sale Day." Outsiders, many of which reside in the surrounding towns and cities, visit the town to attend this annual event.

Wind farm

A large fraction of Meadow Lake Wind Farm, one of the largest onshore wind farms in the world, is located just west of Chalmers. The first turbine in the farm was constructed northwest of Chalmers and was visible from the north edge of the town. Today, the turbines can be spotted from within the town. The wind farm attracts tourists and has sparked a trend of turbine appearances in local art and photography. Following the construction of wind turbines near I-65, the traffic of the Chalmers Interstate exit increased substantially. Plans have been made for a tourism center near that Interstate exit. In addition to cultural impact, the wind farm has affected the local economy due to the farmland leasing involved with turbine placement.

Chalmers Historical Museum

A group of locals has expressed interest in the history of Chalmers, much of which seems to be missing. As a result, a committee of residents organized the Chalmers Historical Society which aims to recover and collect historical documents such as photos, yearbooks, newspapers, films, and artifacts. Volunteers also record audio interviews with current and former long-term residents of the town.

This Chalmers Historical Society hopes to soon operate a small museum which would showcase the physical and digital media collected by the committee. As of 2016, a former insurance agency office at 114 E. Main St. in Downtown Chalmers is being renovated for this purpose. Once completed, committee members and other volunteers will supervise the facility and allow public browsing on weekends and during special occasions.

The society and its museum are financed solely by benefactors. Most of the collection is recovered through donation as well.

Parks and recreation

Chalmers Community Park

In the town is an outdoor complex called Chalmers Community Park, which features several recreational points of interest. It is a common location for seasonal sports competitions and everyday outdoor activities. The park is located on an alley with parking space.

Activities
A playground includes various swings, slides, see-saws, a merry-go-round, and other climbing structures. The complex also includes two fenced softball fields, one multi-use (soccer) field, a beach-style volleyball court, and horseshoe tossing pits.

Buildings
The park has a pavilion shelter, which includes a concession stand, trash cans, picnic tables, and a drinking fountain. The pavilion can be rented for special occasions such as birthday parties and reunions. Electrical outlets are provided. A small building west of the playground contains restrooms.  Contact Chalmers Town Hall to rent the pavilion.

Trails
In the park is a network of connected walking trails. Overall, the walking park consists of 3,500 feet of trail. Originally chip seal, the trails were recently resurfaced with recycled asphalt from Indiana State Road 43. The park allows pets and encourages dog walking on these trails. Along the trails are several rest areas which include benches, trash cans, and community-planted flowers. From the trails, one can see to the horizon over the surrounding farmland.

Management

The complex is maintained by a community management board. Park board meetings occur each month at the Chalmers Town Hall and are regularly open to the public.

Future plans

The park board plans to make considerable improvements to Chalmers Community Park. The currently separate restrooms will be converted to unisex. The park's signs will be replaced. Lighting will be installed throughout the walking trails, allowing residents to utilize the park after dusk. Hundreds of new trees and shrubs are planned for purchase to be planted throughout the trails. Additionally, residents who adopt garden plots in the trails will be recognized by plaques. At least one new shelter will be constructed on the opposite side of the park as the current pavilion. Additional restroom facilities will be installed in the shelters. New basketball and volleyball courts will be installed.

Basketball court

There is a community basketball court on Walnut Street east of the town hall and fire station. The court is lighted during dark hours.

Downtown park

In September 2013, the Chalmers Civic Club announced its intention to transform a vacant lot in Downtown Chalmers into a small outdoor park area. The lot is located immediately east of the post office. The new park was to provide a reading and lounging area with covered seating. It would also significantly improve the ambience of Downtown. The Civic Club hopes that it will spark other cosmetic improvements in the area as well.

By November, the lot was cleared and the post office wall was primed for a future mural. New sidewalks and other cement work was installed, and decorative stone was laid. The following spring, the project resumed. A custom gazebo was constructed on the cement platform in the center of the lot, providing covered seating. Trash cans and flower boxes were also placed.

In 2013, the Civic Club approached the Art Club at Frontier Jr./Sr. High School about incorporating local student art into the project. They also hoped that this would spark youthful interest in community betterment. The Art Club volunteered to paint a mural on the exterior of the post office. The mural, now complete, is modeled on a black-and-white photograph of the Chalmers depot with an approaching steam locomotive. The date of the photograph is unknown. Atop the mural is the text, "Mudge's Station," a historical name for the town. In 2015, the Art Club began working on a second mural which paints a vision of Chalmers's vibrant past. It is modeled on a color photograph of Downtown Chalmers in its prime with many active storefronts. Beneath the photograph, the mural reads, "Building a better Community," which reflects the mission of the Civic Club.

Future plans for the Downtown park include mounting five plaques on the cement wall in honor of the men and women who have served in the military. A potential location for another mural is the Chalmers Historical Museum directly to the east of the park.

References

External links
Chalmers

Further reading

Towns in Indiana
Towns in White County, Indiana